Blampied may refer to:

Places:
Blampied, Victoria, town in the central highlands of Victoria on the Midland Highway

Surname:
Edmund Blampied (1886–1966), one of the most eminent artists to come from the Channel Islands
Katie Blampied or Katie Ritchie, retired netball player as well as international rower and triathlete from New Zealand
Rachael Blampied, played Bree Hamilton on the New Zealand soap opera Shortland Street from December 2011 to September 2012

Fiction:
Rev. John Sylvester Blampied, character in Random Harvest by James Hilton